The 45th Pennsylvania House of Representatives District is located in southwest Pennsylvania and has been represented by Anita Astorino Kulik since 2016.

District profile

The 45th District is located in Allegheny County and includes the following areas:

Bridgeville
 Carnegie
Collier Township
 Coraopolis
 Kennedy Township
McKees Rocks
 Neville Township
 Pennsbury Village
 Robinson Township
 Stowe Township

Representatives

Recent election results

References

External links
District Map from the United States Census Bureau
Pennsylvania House Legislative District Maps from the Pennsylvania Redistricting Commission.  
Population Date for District 45 from the Pennsylvania Redistricting Commission.

Government of Allegheny County, Pennsylvania
45